Montecchio Precalcino is a town and comune in the province of Vicenza, Veneto, Italy. It is situated on the west side of the Astico creek.

The main attraction is the patrician Villa Forni Cerato, attributed by some scholars to Andrea Palladio.

People 
 Sante Carollo (1924–2004), cyclist.
 Sebastiano Peruzzo (1980), football referee.
 Giovanni Anapoli, racing car driver.
 David Campese, rugby playeR

Sources 
Google Maps

References 

Cities and towns in Veneto